is a 1991 video game collection developed and published by Capcom, originally released for the arcades using the CPS-1 platform. It includes three related titles:  a platformer;  a scrolling shooter; and  a puzzle video game.

Gameplay

Midnight Wanderers 
A platform game that sees the player control a hobbit named Lou and his travelling companion, Siva, to run, climb, and shoot at enemies to fight a villain who is turning their people into wooden statues.

Chariot 
A scrolling shooter game featuring the characters from Midnight Wanderers flying in their chariots to save their home planet and princess.

Don't Pull 
A puzzle game similar to games like the Adventures of Lolo series, Pengo, and Capcom's own puzzle game Pirate Ship Higemaru. It involves the player controlling either a rabbit named Don (Player 1) or a squirrel called Pull (Player 2), pushing blocks to crush monsters.

Luo appears also in Marvel vs. Capcom: Clash of Super Heroes as an assist character in game. He was also playable character on Capcom Super League, from Kakao Games, a mobile tactical RPG crossover on beta-test (2018-2019).

Development and release 
Three Wonders was released in the arcades on May 20, 1991. A version for the Capcom Power System Changer was planned and previewed but never released.

In 1998, it was ported to the PlayStation and Sega Saturn and published by Xing Entertainment. Three Wonders was also included in the 2006 Capcom Classics Collection Vol. 2 on the PlayStation 2 and Xbox,  Capcom Classics Collection Remixed on the PSP and Capcom Arcade 2nd Stadium.

Reception 
In Japan, Game Machine listed Three Wonders on their August 1, 1991 issue as being the fifth most-successful table arcade unit of the month. Retro Gamer regarded 3 Wonders as a good alternative to Biomechanical Toy. GameFan reviewed the PlayStation version as inferior to the original arcade game due to bad quality converted graphics.

Notes

References

External links 
 
 

1991 video games
Arcade video games
Cancelled Capcom Power System Changer games
Capcom games
Cooperative video games
CP System games
Multiplayer and single-player video games
PlayStation (console) games
Sega Saturn games
Video games developed in Japan
Xing Entertainment games